This page is the discography of the Dutch-born Greek singer Nikos Vertis.

It consists of ten studio albums and twenty-five singles, including "Thelo Na Me Niosis" which is the first Greek song that has got more than 100 million views on YouTube.

Discography

Studio albums

Compilation albums

Singles

References

Discographies of Greek artists